George Hubert Bates (December 8, 1884 – July 22, 1978) was an American politician. He served as the State Treasurer of Missouri from 1953 to 1957.

References

External links
 George Hubert Bates Biography at treasurer.mo.gov

1884 births
1978 deaths
State treasurers of Missouri
Missouri Democrats
20th-century American politicians